Jessica May (born December 5, 1993) is a Brazilian and Turkish actress and model, based in Turkey. May made her acting debut with a leading role on the Turkey television series Yeni Gelin (2017–18). She later starred in the film Dert Bende (2019) and Katakulli (2022) film series.

Early life 
Jessica May was born on December 5, 1993 in Paranacity, Brazil. Her mother is a teacher and her father is a farmer. She lived on a farm until she was 15 years old, and worked in São Paulo before beginning an acting career in Turkey.

Career 
The first actress experience of May in professional terms has been with the Yeni Gelin, launched in 2017. Also it was her first leading role. Yeni Gelin continued 3 seasons with 63 episodes. She later rose to prominence by acting in the cinema movie  Dert Bende in 2019. May walked the catwalk at Mercedes-Benz Fashion Week in Istanbul.
Jessica played the character of "Maria" on ATV (Turkish TV channel)'s series Maria ile Mustafa (Maria and Mustafa) She currently stars as one of the lead roles in the ATV's series Yalnız Kurt produced by Osman Sınav.

Personal life 
May married Turkish photographer Hüseyin Kara on June 30, 2018. She became Turkish citizen by marriage in 2022.

Filmography

Films

Television series

Commercials 
 Özdilek (2018–19)

Awards and nominations

References

External links 

 
 

Living people
Brazilian television actresses
Brazilian film actresses
Turkish television actresses
Turkish film actresses
1993 births